Carlotism was a political movement that took place in the Viceroyalty of the Río de la Plata between 1808 and 1812; it intended to make Carlota Joaquina, Infanta of Spain and Queen Consort of Portugal, its monarch.

After Napoleon's invasion of Spain, Fernando VII, Carlota's younger brother, was forced to abdicate and give the throne to Joseph Bonaparte. Most Spanish did not consider him a legitimate king and Carlota, an ambitious woman, seemed like a possible option to keep the royal line safe. 

Carlota was living in Brazil by then, after the nobility of Portugal moved from Portugal to the Americas because of Napoleón's invasion of Portugal. 

Carlotism found strong resistance from many parties involved: the viceroys, other Spanish authorities in the Americas, part of the Criollos, and the British. The plans were never applied, and supporters of it would later turn to independence.

See also
Carlota Joaquina of Spain

References

House of Bourbon (Spain)
Peninsular War
Spanish American wars of independence
Eponymous political ideologies
Political movements
Viceroyalty of the Río de la Plata
Manuel Belgrano